The Lemme is a 35 km torrent, a right tributary of the Orba, which flows through the Province of Alessandria in northern Italy.

Geography 
Its source is near Monte Calvo; from there it passes through the communes of 
Fraconalto, Voltaggio, Carrosio, Gavi, San Cristoforo, Francavilla Bisio, Basaluzzo and finally Predosa where it enters the Orba.

Main tributaries

left hand tributaries
 rio delle Acque Striate;
 rio Morsone: it starts near Monte Tobbio and meets the Lemme in Voltaggio; 
 rio Ardana: its upper valley includes Bosio, from which flows northwards meeting the Lemme in Gavi;
 rio Riolo: from San Cristoforo it runs not faraway from the Lemme meeting it near its confluence with the Orba.

right hand tributaries
 rio Carbonasca: from Fraconalto goes till Voltaggio where it meets the Lemme;
 torrente Neirone:
 torrente Riasco: it collects the waters flowing in the area of Pasturana and Tassarolo and meets the Lemme near Francavilla Bisio.

Floods
The Lemme is characterised by an extremely variable discharge; very little water flows during the summer months, but it can also give rise to significant floods, such as those of 1978.

History 
The Département du Lemo or Dipartimento del Lemo of Ligurian Republic took its name at the end of the 18th century from the stream.

References

Rivers of the Province of Alessandria
Rivers of Italy